E49 may refer to:
 HMS E49
 European route E49
 Ban-etsu Expressway, route E49 in Japan